San Ysidro High School is a co-educational public four-year (grade levels 9–12) high school located in San Diego, California. It was founded and established in 2002, and is part of the Sweetwater Union High School District. SYHS predominantly serves San Ysidro and other parts of San Diego with a student enrollment of 2,408.

History

San Ysidro High School was established in the summer of 2002, and was named after the community in which the institution predominantly serves, "San Ysidro, California." Prior to its establishment, the community did not have a high school in which the nearby K-8 educational district, the San Ysidro Elementary School District, could feed students into. This resulted in many middle school students transferring to different schools within the Sweetwater Union High School District, such as Southwest Senior High School. However, once the school opened, many students began enrolling in the school, as it was much closer compared to neighboring schools.

Demographics
Of the students enrolled at San Ysidro High School, 51.6% are male, 48.4% are female. Racial and ethnic breakdown is 88.1% Hispanic or Latino, 3.5% Asian, 1.3% multi-racial 1.6% black, 5.1% caucasian, with 0.3% or less of indigenous.

In addition, 66% of students qualify for free or reduced lunch prices.

Academics

San Ysidro High School offers a dozen Advanced Placement programs.

Notable Programs
Men's Basketball Team - 2020 CIF Division 3 Champions
'CougarBots' Robotics Team - Competed at the 2017, 2019, 2020, and 2021 VEX Robotics World Competition
Men/Women's Tennis Team - 2021 South Bay League Champions

Athletics
San Ysidro High School offers the following athletic programs:

Fall
Football 
Volleyball (Women)
Water-Polo (Men)
Tennis (Women)
Cross Country (Men/Women)
Golf (Women)

Winter
Soccer (Men/Women)
Basketball (Men/Women)
Wrestling (Men/Women)
Roller Hockey
Water-Polo (Women)

Spring
Track and Field (Men/Women)
Golf (Men)
Tennis (Men)
Baseball
Swim and Dive (Men/Women)
Softball
Volleyball (Men)
Lacrosse (Women)

Notable alumni
Miguel Ángel Ponce, Class of 2007 - Soccer Player for CD Guadalajara
Mikey Williams, Class of 2023 - Basketball Player.

See also

 Primary and secondary schools in San Diego, California

References

External links
San Ysidro High School Website
San Ysidro Cougar Pride Band
San Ysidro Science Club
San Ysidro High School Mariachi Club
San Ysidro High School Grupo Folklorico
San Ysidro High Drama Club

High schools in San Diego
Public high schools in California
Educational institutions established in 2002
2002 establishments in California